Velutini is an Italian surname that may refer to the following notable people:
José Antonio Velutini (1844–1912), Venezuelan statesman
Julio Herrera Velutini (born 1971), international banker
Luis Emilio Velutini (born 1953), Venezuelan businessman and investor 

Italian-language surnames